George Anderson Gordon (September 26, 1830 – October 5, 1872) was an American politician.

Gordon was born in Savannah, Ga., Sept. 26th, 1830.  He entered the Sophomore Class at Yale College in Sept., 1846, and after graduation in 1849 remained for a year, engaged in the study of law, in the Law Department. In Nov., 1850, he began the practice of his profession in Newark, N. J., but in the following summer returned to Savannah, where he continued in practice till the close of the year 1860. During this period he was, successively, U. S. District Attorney and Member of the Georgia House of Representatives. In 1860-61 he was a member of the Georgia State Senate, and then entered the Confederate military service, as captain in the 1st Regiment of Georgia Volunteers. He subsequently became major and colonel.
After the close of the war, he removed to Huntsville, where he engaged in the practice of the law until his last illness.  He died in Huntsville, age 42.

He married Carolina B. Steenbergen, of Virginia, June 5, 1850. She died July 16, 1851, leaving one son He was again married, January 12, 1854, to Ellen C. Bevine, of Huntsville, Alabama, who died August 15, 1867, leaving six children, one of whom, Percy Gordon, was the father of diplomat George A. Gordon.

References

External links

1830 births
1872 deaths
Yale Law School alumni
New Jersey lawyers
Members of the Georgia House of Representatives
Georgia (U.S. state) state senators
Politicians from Savannah, Georgia
Confederate States Army officers
19th-century American politicians
Yale College alumni
19th-century American lawyers